Made in U.S.A. is a novel by the American writer Alfred Kern.

The story is set in the 1960s in Braden, Pennsylvania, a fictional mill town north of Pittsburgh. Protagonist Steve Hamner is a successful trade unionist for the fictional United Ore and Metal Workers, AFL-CIO. He meets Paula Montefiore, a displaced intellectual from a Kafkaesque Eastern Europe, who is seeking to make a new life in the United States. The two characters confront each other about the meaning of the American dream.

References

1966 American novels
Novels set in Pennsylvania